Tony Scott is an American politician currently serving as a member of the Connecticut House of Representatives from the 112th district, which includes the town of Monroe and parts of Easton and Trumbull. Scott is a member of the Republican Party. Scott was elected to the seat during a special election which was held after incumbent Republican J.P. Sredzinski vacated the seat in February 2021. Scott beat out Democrat Nick Kapoor by over 7 points in the April 13th election.  Most recently, Scott won re-election in a landslide, overwhelmingly beating his opponent by almost 20 points to win a second term in Hartford.

Personal life and education
Born in Orlando, Scott has lived in Monroe, Connecticut, since 2007. He earned a bachelor's degree in broadcast journalism with a minor in history from Penn State University. Scott married his wife, Jenn, in 2003 in Newtown, Connecticut. They have twin girls, Lauren and Addison, who were born in Monroe, Connecticut, in 2008.

Professional career
Scott has worked in marketing most of his professional career. He is currently the senior promotions manager at Edgewell Personal Care in Shelton, Connecticut.  Before his current role, he worked in a similar role for Henkel Corporation in Stamford, Connecticut. He also worked on the floor of the Chicago Mercantile Exchange in Chicago, Illinois, from 2002-2007.

Public service career
Since moving to Monroe, Scott has served on local boards and commissions before becoming state representative. Scott first served on the Monroe Economic Development before moving to the Monroe Parks & Recreation Commission. He served there for 9 years and was chairman for the last 6 years of his service to the commission. He was next appointed to Monroe’s town council, serving over a year before resigning to become state representative.

Committee and leadership positions
For the term of 2023–2025, Scott has been appointed ranking member of the Housing Committee, while also serving on the General Law and Higher Education & Employment Advancement Committees.

During his Freshman term (2021–2023), Scott served on three committees: Public Safety & Security, Human Services and Higher Education & Employment Advancement.

Legislative record
Scott has consistently voted to support veterans, businesses, affordability for residents, local control and animals.  He is against raising taxes and unfunded mandates that get passed down to municipalities.

As a freshman, Scott helped introduce two bills that will directly help constituents in his district.

1. SB 370 (Public Act 22-130) - AN ACT CONCERNING THE CONDITIONS UNDER WHICH PRIVATE INVESTIGATORS AND SECURITY GUARDS MAY PERFORM DUTIES WHILE LICENSE APPLICATIONS ARE PENDING - This bill was brought to his attention by a constituent. He quickly acted to support this bill which would make it easier for Security companies to make new hires in a timely fashion.  Bill passed in the House in concurrence with Senate on May 4, 2022.  Signed by Governor Lamont on May 27, 2022.

2. SB 333 (Public Act 22-44) - AN ACT CONCERNING RECOMMENDATIONS BY THE DEPARTMENT OF MOTOR VEHICLES AND VARIOUS REVISIONS TO THE MOTOR VEHICLE STATUTES - Scott introduced a portion of this bill that was originally brought to his attention by a mother and her son in his District. He also responded quickly, testifying in support of the pending bill that would allow drivers who have low vision to use Bioptic Lenses to take their driver’s license exam and to drive.  Bill passed in concurrence with Senate on May 2, 2022.  Signed by Governor Lamont on May 17, 2022.

For the second straight year, Scott also was recognized with a 100% score by The Connecticut Business and Industry Association (CBIA) for his exceptional voting record in support of both Connecticut businesses and workers.

Since taking office in April 2021, Scott has a 100 percent voting record. He maintained that perfect record through the recent short session which ran thru May 4, 2022.

Electoral history

References

External links
Legislative Website
Ballotpedia

Republican Party members of the Connecticut House of Representatives
Living people
21st-century American politicians
People from Monroe, Connecticut
People from Orlando, Florida
1976 births